Casey Hill (born 1983) is an American professional basketball coach who serves as assistant coach for the New Orleans Pelicans of the National Basketball Association (NBA). Hill previously served four years as the head coach for the Santa Cruz Warriors of the NBA Development League.

Playing career
Casey Hill played for Trinity University in San Antonio during Hill's time as a Trinity player (from 2003–04 to 2006–07) the Tigers advanced three times to the NCAA Division III Playoffs. The 2004–05 team ended the season in the NCAA Div.III Elite Eight. Trinity also captured two Southern Collegiate Athletic Conference Championships with Hill as a player.

Coaching career
During the 2010–11 season he served as an assistant basketball coach to his father – longtime NBA coach Bob Hill – for the Tokyo Apache. The Tokyo Apache were a basketball team which competed in the top-level Japanese professional League.

The Golden State Warriors hired him in 2011. During the 2011–12 season he worked as an assistant coach for the Tokyo Apache. In 2012–13 Casey served as an assistant coach for Santa Cruz Warriors. In 2013, he became the head coach for the Santa Cruz Warriors. In 2015, Hill led Santa Cruz to the NBA Development League Championship. In 2017, Hill was hired as head coach by the Agua Caliente Clippers.

On November 16, 2020, Hill was hired as assistant coach by the New Orleans Pelicans.

Personal life
Hill's father is Bob Hill, a college, NBA, and international basketball coach. Hill has two brothers. The oldest, Cameron, is currently the head women's basketball coach at Trinity University in San Antonio and is the owner of CHB, specializing in player development and team training. The other brother, Chris, is the head basketball coach at Jesuit College Preparatory School of Dallas.

References

1983 births
Living people
Agua Caliente Clippers coaches
American expatriate basketball people in Japan
American men's basketball coaches
Los Angeles Clippers assistant coaches
New Orleans Pelicans assistant coaches
Santa Cruz Warriors coaches
Trinity Tigers men's basketball players